The Académie Internationale de Droit Constitutionnel or International Academy for Constitutional Law (IACL) was created in 1984 and is based in Tunis, Tunisia.

The official language of the academy is French. Its members come from more than 50 countries. The aim of the academy is to promote the study of constitutional law with an international approach, and by comparing different systems.

Legal organisations based in Tunisia
Constitutional law